Dope is a 1919 novel by Sax Rohmer set in the Limehouse area of London. It is not a Fu Manchu novel, and concerns itself with cannabis rather than opium. It is based on the story of Billie Carleton, a young English actress whose scandalous lifestyle ended with her death from a drug overdose in 1918.

Adaptations
The novel was adapted into comics by Trina Robbins between 1981 and 1983 in Eclipse Magazine and Eclipse Monthly. IDW Publishing published a collected edition of this work in 2017, with a postface by John B. Cooke.

See also
List of works by Sax Rohmer

References

External links
 
 Dope: Sax Rohmer at the Internet Archive
 Sax Rohmer's Dope graphic novel on Google Books
 

Novels adapted into comics
Novels by Sax Rohmer
1919 British novels